Mundialito may refer to:
 1980 Mundialito, international football tournament held in 1980 in Uruguay
 Mundialito (women), international football tournament held from 1981 to 1988
 BSWW Mundialito, international beach soccer tournament between national teams
 Mundialito de Clubes, international beach soccer tournament between clubs
 Futsal Mundialito, futsal tournament

See also
Little World Cup (disambiguation)